The McGregor Memorial Conference Center is an office building located at 495 Ferry Mall, on the campus of Wayne State University in Midtown Detroit, Michigan. Completed in 1958, the building was the first commission of the noted Japanese-American architect Minoru Yamasaki marking his shift from traditional International Style to a style known as the New Formalism.  The building was designated a National Historic Landmark for its architecture in 2015.

History

The McGregor Memorial Conference Center was funded by the McGregor Fund, as a memorial to Tracy W. and Katherine McGregor who initiated the fund in 1925. The McGregor Fund specified that the building be used as "a community conference center for groups of citizens interested in exploring ways and means of being helpful to others." To that end, Wayne State University hired architect Minoru Yamasaki in August 1955 to design the building. The commission came after Yamasaki's long convalescence and subsequent trip to Japan, and was his first opportunity to put into practice his re-envisionment of architecture. The center was completed in 1958, and opened to immediate accolades from architectural magazines who called it "delightful" and "refreshing," and from the American Institute of Architects who awarded Yamasaki a First Honor Award for the design. Over the next seven years, Yamasaki designed three more buildings for Wayne's campus: the Education Building, Prentis Hall, and DeRoy Auditorium.

Description
The McGregor Memorial Conference Center is a two-story symmetrical pavilion covered with travertine marble. It sits on a podium faced with Mankato stone, with integral reflecting pool and sunken garden wrapping around the building on two sides. The building exhibits a triangular design motif on the outside and inside. Inside, a skylit entry hall, dividing the interior space in two, is flanked by two levels of conference rooms. The McGregor Center contains 11 meeting rooms, a 600-seat auditorium, a  reception area, and a  exhibit space. The conference rooms can be combined to accommodate groups of various sizes. Interior design features white marble floors, red carpeting, and black leather chairs by Mies van der Rohe.

Gallery

See also

List of National Historic Landmarks in Michigan
National Register of Historic Places listings in Detroit, Michigan

References

National Register of Historic Places in Detroit
Wayne State University
1958 establishments in Michigan
Buildings and structures completed in 1958
International style architecture in Michigan
National Historic Landmarks in Michigan
Minoru Yamasaki buildings